WGNL 104.3 FM is a radio station licensed to Greenwood, Mississippi.  The station broadcasts a blues and Urban Oldies format and is owned by Team Broadcasting Company, Inc.

References

External links
WGNL's official website

GNL
Urban oldies radio stations in the United States